Max Richardson (born 17 September 1991) is a British sailor.

Together with team mate Alex Groves Richardson became third at the 2008 World Championships in the 29er boat by finishing behind Australian couples Steven Thomas/Jasper Warren and Byron White/William Ryan to claim the bronze.

Career highlights
World Championships
2008 - Sorrento,  3rd, 29er (with Alex Groves)

External links 
 
 29er World Championships
 Gold And Silver To Australia At 29er Worlds

Living people
British male sailors (sport)
29er class sailors
1991 births